All-Night Lotus Party is a 1986 record from the band Volcano Suns.

In 2009, the album was remastered by Bob Weston, and reissued by Merge Records with bonus tracks.

Reception

The Allmusic review by Andy Kellman states, "The noisier abandon is immediately apparent from Jon Williams' nasty abrasion at the beginning of "White Elephant," undeniably sounding much like some of Roger Miller's more memorable antics in Mission of Burma. And with that song, as with The Bright Orange Years' "Jak," the band once again sticks their catchiest (and funniest) song at the very beginning, as if to grab the listener by the throat, and the grip here never really slackens. Aside from the near-ballad "Room with a View" and the schizo tempo shifts in "Blown Stack," the first side—also highlighted by the charmingly sloppy neo-rockabilly of "Cans" and the hurtling "Walk Around"—whips by at breakneck speed, while the second side is slower yet no less rowdy or welcoming. ".

Track listing

Personnel 

Lou Giordano – engineer
Peter Prescott – drums, vocals
Volcano Suns – producer
Jeff Weigand – bass, vocals, photography
Jon Williams – guitar, vocals, engineer

References

1986 albums
Volcano Suns albums